Ptyctolaemus is a genus of agamid lizards from southern Asia.

Species
There are three species:
Ptyctolaemus chindwinensis Liu, Hou, Lwin, & Rao, 2021
Ptyctolaemus collicristatus Schulte & Vindum, 2004
Ptyctolaemus gularis (Peters, 1864) – green fan-throated lizard

References

Ptyctolaemus
Lizard genera
Lizards of Asia
Taxa named by Wilhelm Peters